Bladderpod is a common name for several plants and may refer to:

Cleome isomeris, a species of flowering plant in the family Cleomaceae
Lesquerella, a genus of flowering plants in the Family Brassicaceae, now considered a synonym of Physaria
Lobelia inflata, a species of flowering plant in the family Campanulaceae
Paysonia, a genus of flowering plants in the family Brassicaceae
Peritoma arborea,  a species of flowering plant in the family Cleomaceae
Physaria, a genus of flowering plants in the family Brassicaceae